Yamaha Supercross is a video game of the racing genre for the Wii, the Nintendo DS, PC and the PS2 video game consoles developed by Coyote Console and published by Zoo Digital in the United Kingdom, and by DSI Games in North America. It was first released in November 2008 in North America. The Wii version is built from the ground up, as opposed to simply being a port of the PS2 version. The game, particularly the Wii version, is heavily criticized by reviewers.

External links
Official Coyote Console Website

2008 video games
Racing video games
Wii games
Nintendo DS games
PlayStation 2 games

Video games developed in the United Kingdom
Windows games
Destination Software games